Asteromyrtus arnhemica is a species of plant in the myrtle family Myrtaceae that is native to northern Australia.

Description
The species grows as a shrub or small tree up to about 5 m in height.

Distribution and habitat
The species is found in the extreme north-eastern part of Western Australia in the Victoria Bonaparte bioregion and the north of the Northern Territory. It grows on sandstone substrates along the banks of seasonal creeks, wet tracks and near waterfalls.

References

 
arnhemica
Myrtales of Australia
Flora of the Northern Territory
Flora of Western Australia
Endemic flora of Australia
Plants described in 1984